BSTAR is a way of modeling aerodynamic drag on a satellite in the simplified general perturbation model 4 satellite orbit propagation model.

Traditionally, aerodynamic resistance ("drag") is given by

where
 is the air density,
 is the drag coefficient,
 is the frontal area, and
 is the velocity.

The acceleration due to drag is then

In aerodynamic theory, the factor

is the inverse of the ballistic coefficient, and its unit is area per mass. Further incorporating a reference air density and the factor of two in the denominator, we get the starred ballistic coefficient:

thus reducing the expression for the acceleration due to drag to

As it can be seen,  has a unit of inverse length. For orbit propagation purposes, there is a field for BSTAR drag in two-line element set (TLE) files, where it is to be given in units of inverse Earth radii. One must be very careful when using the value of  released in the TLEs, as it is fitted to work on the SGP4 orbit propagation framework and, as a consequence, may even be negative as an effect of unmodelled forces on the orbital determination process.

References

Spaceflight concepts
Orbits